Toimo(?–?) The ancestors of the Qing dynasty. He is the second son of Cungšan, Nurhaci's great-great-great-granduncle. His family name is Aisin Gioro (愛新覺羅).

History 
The leader of the Jianzhou Nüzhen (建州女真) in the Ming dynasty, He was Tolo's brother, the older brother of Sibeoci Fiyanggū, Sibeoci Fiyanggū was Nurhaci's great-great-grandfather. In the time of birth and death due righteousness is unknown, about life in Chenghua (成化) years, died without an heir.

Family 
 Paternal Grandfather: Mentemu (孟特穆)
Father: Cungšan (充善)
Uncle: Chu Yan (褚宴)

Brother 
The eldest brother: Tolo (妥羅)
Three younger brother: Sibeoci Fiyanggū (錫寶齊篇古)

Bibliography 
"Draft History of Qing" (清史稿)/Volume 1
The same book/Volume 161

Notes 

Manchu people